Oakdale Christian Academy is a private, Methodist, co-educational boarding and day school in Jackson, Kentucky, United States. It was established in 1921 by Elizabeth E. O’Connor.

History 
Oakdale was founded in 1921 by Elizabeth E O'Connor in a one-room elementary school for local children. It was originally called Oakdale Vocational School, and served needy children. It was later renamed Oakdale Christian High School.

In 1968, the Free Methodist Church of North America gave the governance and authority of Oakdale Christian High School to an independent board of trustees. This occurred as the Free Methodist Church's priorities shifted from domestic to foreign missions.

Oakdale is accredited by the Southern Association of Colleges and Schools (SACS) and the Association of Christian Schools International (ACSI).

Demographics 
The demographic breakdown of the 60 students enrolled in 2017-2018 was:
 Asian - 18.3%
 Black - 20.0%
 Hispanic - 6.7%
 White - 55.0%

Athletics 
The Oakdale Wildcats compete interscholastically under the auspices of the Kentucky Christian School Athletic Association. Basketball is offered for boys and volleyball for girls.

References 

Schools in Breathitt County, Kentucky
Private middle schools in Kentucky
Private high schools in Kentucky
Boarding schools in Kentucky
Christian schools in Kentucky
Methodist schools in the United States
Educational institutions established in 1921
1921 establishments in Kentucky